Südinnenstadt is a statistical area of the city of Bochum in the Ruhr area, an agglomeration of about 5 million residents in Germany. Up to the 19th century Westphalian was spoken here. Südinnenstadt is a statistical area to the south of the central business district. Südinnenstadt includes the Schauspielhaus, one of the most expensively funded theatres in the Ruhr area.
Südinnenstadt has one of the highest percentages of people living alone in the Ruhr area.

References

Bochum